Morocco: Love in Times of War is a war drama set primarily in 1920s Melilla, a Spanish city located in North Africa. Occurring during the Rif War or Morocco War, the series revolves around a group of nurses from Madrid who are sent to Africa by Queen Victoria Eugenia to open a hospital in the war torn region. The nurses learn firsthand the cruelty of war, but still find time for romance. The series debuted in 2017 on Antena 3 and in 2018 on Netflix.

Plot
In 1921, Morocco is being ravaged by the events of the Rif War. The Riffian resistance in the country has killed many soldiers of the Spanish Army and wounded many more. To succour them, Queen Victoria Eugenie sends a group of nurses from the Spanish Red Cross to Melilla to establish a new hospital. Led by the Duchess of Victoria, María del Carmen Angoloti y Mesa, the group is composed of young women from Spain's upper classes.

The nurses arrive in Melilla and set up a hospital in an old school building. Almost immediately, they are put into action. Yet, despite all the horrors of war that surround them, these nurses have not lost hope and still find  romance with the soldiers and doctors who surround them.

In time, the military high command recognizes that more lives can be saved on the front lines before wounded soldiers are even brought back to the hospital. None of these nurses is combat trained, but some of them will now have to learn how to stay alive while serving on the front lines.

Cast

Production 
Produced by Atresmedia Televisión in collaboration with Bambú Producciones, the series was created by Ramón Campos, Teresa Fernández-Valdés and Gemma R. Neira. Filming began in March 2017. Shooting locations included Chinchón, Tenerife, Toledo and Madrid. The episodes were directed by David Pinillos, Manuel Gómez Pereira and Eduardo Chapero Jackson whereas the writing team was formed by Carlos López, Daniel Martín Serrano, Estibaliz Burgaleta, Nacho Pérez de la Paz and Miguel Ángel Fernández. Ramón Campos, Teresa Fernández-Valdés and Sonia Martínez were credited as executive producers. The musical score was composed by Federico Jusid.

Release

Awards and nominations 

|-
| align = "center" rowspan = "4" | 2017 || rowspan = "4" | 5th  || colspan = "2" | Best Drama Series ||  || rowspan = "4" | 
|-
| colspan = "2" | Best Screenplay || 
|-
| Best Drama Actress || Alicia Borrachero || 
|-
| Best Drama Actor || Álex García || 
|}

References

External links
 

Spanish-language television shows
Television shows set in Morocco
War television series
Antena 3 (Spanish TV channel) network series
Television shows set in Spain
2010s Spanish drama television series
2017 Spanish television series debuts
2017 Spanish television series endings
Television shows filmed in Spain
Television series set in the 1920s
Television series by Bambú Producciones
Melilla in fiction